Capri is an Italian island in the Gulf of Naples.

Capri or CAPRI may also refer to:

Arts and entertainment
 Capri (TV series), an Italian television series
 Capri Records, a short-lived record label based in Texas
 Capri Records (Jazz record label) founded in 1984 and currently active
 The Capris, an Italian-American doo-wop group
 The Capris (Los Angeles group), a 1960s African-American doo-wop group from Los Angeles
 The Capris (Philadelphia group), a group from Philadelphia, formed in 1953
 The Capris, a group that recorded with Doris Browne

Ford Motor Company cars
 Ford Capri, a European-built automobile from 1969 through 1987, sold in the United States as the "Capri"
 Lincoln Capri, a model from the 1950s
 Mercury Capri, a version of the Ford Mustang marketed under the Mercury marque in the United States from 1979 through 1986
 Ford Capri (Australia), an Australian Ford Capri convertible, from 1989 through 1994 and sold in the United States as the Mercury Capri

Business
 Capri (cigarette), a brand manufactured by R.J. Reynolds
 Hotel Capri, a now-closed hotel in Havana, Cuba
 Capri Cinema (Chicago), now defunct
 Capri Holdings formerly Michael Kors Holdings Limited
 Capri Sun, a brand of juice concentration drinks
 Capri Theatre, a cinema in Adelaide, South Australia

CAPRI
 CAPRI model, the abbreviation for Common Agricultural Policy Regionalised Impact model, a tool for agricultural policy impact assessment
 Caribbean Policy Research Institute (CaPRI), a public policy think tank in Jamaica
 Critical Assessment of Prediction of Interactions, a protein-protein docking structure prediction experiment

Other uses
 Capri (color), a tint of blue
 Capri (horse), thoroughbred racehorse, winner of the 2017 Irish Derby
 Capri (town), the main town of the island
 Capri pants, a style of trousers
 Operation Capri (or Battle of Medenine), a German World War II counteroffensive
 An alternate spelling of Capra, the goat genus

People with the given name
 Capri Anderson (born 1988), American actress
 Capri Cafaro (born 1977), a Democratic member of the Ohio Senate
 Capri Virkkunen (born 1972), Finnish lead singer of Amberian Dawn

See also

 Isle of Capri (disambiguation)
 Cari (disambiguation)
 Carpi (disambiguation)